Karel Kavina (September 4, 1890 – January 21, 1948, both in Prague) was a Czech botanist.

Kavina was professor of botany at the Technical University in Prague. He worked on systemics, plant morphology and anatomy, and bryology. He published several atlases and monographs and was editor-in-chief of two botanical journals.

In 1938, botanist Albert Pilát published Kavinia, which is a genus of fungi in the Lentariaceae family. The genus contains five species, and has a largely European distribution. It was named in Kavina's honour.

References

 Příruční slovník naučný 1962 (encyclopedia by Czechoslovak Academy of Sciences): volume II, page 477.

1890 births
1948 deaths
Czechoslovak botanists
Czech botanists
Scientists from Prague
Academic staff of Czech Technical University in Prague